Sidyma , was a town of ancient Lycia, at what is now the small village of Dudurga Asari in Muğla Province, Turkey. It lies on the southern slope of Mount Cragus, to the north-west of the mouth of the Xanthus.

History 
Sidyma was mentioned in the 1st century BC by Alexander Polyhistor, and later by Pliny the Elder, Stephanus of Byzantium, the Synecdemus, and the Notitiae Episcopatuum. Its extant remains are of the time of the Roman Empire, when it was an unimportant but flourishing city, and no Lycian inscriptions have been discovered there and there are no Lycian rock tombs, but its name seems to indicate an earlier origin. Above the present ruins, which lie in a valley, is a wall that may indicate the existence on the hill of a city of which no traces remain.

The one coin of Sidyma that has been found is of the type of the Lycian League.

It is related that the future Byzantine Emperor Marcian, when still a simple soldier, fell asleep while resting on a hunt near Sidyma, and was found to be sheltered by a large eagle, a presage of his future elevation.

Remains 
The ruins of Sidyma, high up on the southern slope of Mount Cragus, were first discovered by Charles Fellows, who described them as consisting chiefly of splendidly built tombs, abounding in Greek inscriptions. The town itself, he said, appeared to have been very small, and the theatre, agora and temples, were of diminutive size, but of great beauty. The theatre is now "badly damaged", "in wretched condition".

Ecclesiastical history

Bishopric 
Sidyma became a Christian bishopric, a suffragan of the Metropolitan see of Mira, the capital of the Roman province of Lycia. The bishop of Sidyma ranked tenth under the metropolitan of Myra.
 
 Its bishop Hypatius was one of the signatories of the letter that the bishops of the province sent in 458 to Byzantine Emperor Leo I the Thracian with regard to the murder of Proterius of Alexandria.
 Zemarchus was at the Third Council of Constantinople in 680 and the Trullan Council of 692.
 Nicodemus took part in the Second Council of Nicaea in 787.
 
The diocese continued to appear in the Notitiae Episcopatuum until the 13th century.

Titular see 
No longer a residential bishopric, Sidyma is today listed by the Catholic Church as a Latin titular bishopric, the diocese being nominally revived in the 19th century.

 It is vacant for decades, having had the following incumbents, of the lowest (episcopal) rank :
 Antoine Missirli (1808.03.18 – 1824.10.16)
 Pierre-Flavien Turgeon (1834.02.28 – 1850.10.03), as Coadjutor Archbishop of Québec (Canada) (1834.02.28 – 1850.10.03), later succeeded as Metropolitan Archbishop of Québec (1850.10.03 – 1867.08.25)
 Joseph Freusberg (1854.04.07 – 1889.11.14)
 Theophile Meerschaert (1891.06.02 – 1905.08.23)
 János Ivánkovits (1905.12.11 – 1910.03.31)
 Paul-Leon-Cornelius Montaigne (满德胎), Lazarists (C.M.) (1924.11.25 – 1962.01.09)
 Michele Federici (1962.09.22 – 1963.10.27) as Coadjutor Bishop of Melfi (Italy) (1962.09.22 – 1963.10.27), later Archbishop of Santa Severina (Italy) (1963.10.27 – 1973.12.21), Archbishop-Bishop of Ferentino (Italy) (1973.12.21 – 1980.11.23), Archbishop-Bishop of Veroli–Frosinone (Italy) (1973.12.21 – 1980.11.23)
 Karl Reiterer, Mill Hill Missionaries (M.H.M.) (1967.02.09 – 1974.12.30)

References

Sources and external links
 GCatholic with titular incumbent bio links

Populated places in ancient Lycia
Ancient Greek archaeological sites in Turkey
Catholic titular sees in Asia
Former populated places in Turkey
Buildings and structures in Muğla Province
Geography of Muğla Province
Tourist attractions in Muğla Province
Fethiye District
Defunct dioceses of the Ecumenical Patriarchate of Constantinople